Chinna Chinna Aasaigal is a 1989 Indian Tamil-language comedy film directed by Muktha S. Sundar, starring Pandiarajan and Malashri. The film was released on 15 December 1989.

Plot

Cast 
Pandiarajan
Rasika
S. S. Chandran
Vijayakumar
Vinu Chakravarthy
Maadhu Balaji
Chinni Jayanth

Soundtrack 
The music was composed by Chandrabose.

Reception 
P. S. S. of Kalki praised the film's humour.

References

External links 
 

1980s Tamil-language films
1989 films
Films scored by Chandrabose (composer)
Indian comedy films